Beck v. Alabama, 447 U.S. 625 (1980), was a United States Supreme Court case in which the Court held that a jury must be allowed to consider lesser included offenses, not just capital offense or acquittal.

Background
Beck was participating in a robbery when his accomplice intentionally killed someone. Beck was tried for capital murder. Under the Code of Alabama, Section 13-11-2 (1975), the requisite intent to kill could not be supplied by the felony murder doctrine. Felony murder was thus a lesser-included offense of the capital crime of robbery with an intentional killing. Under the statute, the judge was specifically prohibited from giving the jury the option of convicting for the lesser-included offense. Absent the statutory ban on such an instruction, Beck's testimony would have entitled him to an instruction on felony murder

Lower Courts
In the lower courts, Beck attacked the ban on the grounds that the Alabama statute was the same as the mandatory death penalty statutes that the Court had been striking down in recent holdings.

Decision of the Supreme Court
Though the lower courts disagreed, the Supreme Court held that the death sentence may not constitutionally be imposed after a jury verdict of guilt of a capital offense where the jury was not permitted to consider a verdict of guilt of a lesser included offense.

See also
 List of United States Supreme Court cases, volume 447

References

External links
 

United States Supreme Court cases
United States Supreme Court cases of the Burger Court
Cruel and Unusual Punishment Clause and death penalty case law
United States criminal due process case law
Capital punishment in Alabama
1980 in United States case law
1980 in Alabama